Echo Lake, is the name of a glacial lake—summer reservoir located in El Dorado County, eastern California, United States.

Geography
Echo Lake is in the Sierra Nevada, and within the El Dorado National Forest.

The lake is divided into two sections; an Upper lake, and a Lower lake.
There has been little development beyond lakeside cabins.

See also
List of lakes in California

References

External links

Lakes of the Sierra Nevada (United States)
Eldorado National Forest
Lakes of El Dorado County, California
Lakes of California
Lakes of Northern California
Reservoirs in California